Aulus Cornelius Cossus Arvina was a Roman politician and general who served as both consul and Magister Equitum twice, and Dictator once in the mid 4th century BC.

Family
Cossus was a member of the patrician gens Cornelia. The gens Cornelia was one of the most important families of the Roman Republican period having first attained the consulate in 485 BC and remaining prominent throughout the next four hundred years, producing figures such as Scipio Africanus and Lucius Cornelius Sulla. Aulus Cornelius Cossus Arvina was descended from the Cossi branch of the Cornelia gens, which were descended from Aulus Cornelius Cossus, a famous Roman of the 5th century BC who had won renown by personally slaying Lars Tolumnius the King of Veii, becoming one of only three Romans in recorded history to acquire the honor of the Spolia opima. Judging by his filiation it seems likely that Publius Cornelius Arvina, who was consul in 306 and 288 BC, was his son.

Magister equitum and first consulship
Cossus first appears in history in 353 BC as the Magister Equitem serving under the dictator Titus Manlius Torquatus. The purpose of Manlius' appointment as dictator was to combat the city of Caere, an Etruscan city whom had recently allied with the city of Tarquinia against Rome. Upon hearing of Rome's appointment of a dictator, the Caerites decided to surrender and a one hundred year long truce was negotiated between the two cities. The campaign was then redirected against the Falisci who were also accused of conspiring against Rome, however the Romans were unable to locate the Faliscan army and instead decided to ravage their territory. The role that Cossus played in these events is unrecorded.

In 349 BC, Torquatus was appointed dictator for a second time, and once again Cossus was appointed as magister equitum. The purpose of the appointment of Torquatus as dictator was to hold the consular elections for the following year, with one of the consuls elected being the young Marcus Valerius Corvus, consul for the first time.

In 343 BC, Cossus was elected consul for the first time, serving alongside Marcus Valerius Corvus, now in his third consulship. It was in this year that the First Samnite War broke out over a dispute between Rome and the Samnites over the city of Capua. In reaction to this, the senate assigned his colleague Valerius with the responsibility of defending Capua from Samnite attacks, while Cossus was ordered to march into Samnium itself. The campaign of Cossus did not start off well, as he had unwisely marched his army into a ravine which was beset on both sides by hostile Samnites, having only realized his mistake when it was far too late to do anything about it. It seemed a hopeless situation for both Cossus and his army when Publius Decius Mus, a military tribune serving under him, contrived a plan to break themselves out of this snare and requested Cossus to give him permission to perform it, which was granted. Thus Decius put his plan into action, taking a small detachment of men to seize the summit of a hill that was undefended by the Samnites, and distracting them from this position so that it gave an opportunity for Cossus and the rest of the army to escape. From this position, Decius and his men, through their own valor as well as through the confused exhaustion of the enemy, managed to break free from the hill and put their enemy to flight, despite being very outnumbered. Following this, Cossus and his army, now combined with the force of Decius, managed to run down the fleeing Samnite army, scoring a decisive victory. To thank Decius for his service, Cossus presented to him many valuable gifts, while the army awarded Decius the Grass Crown, an extremely prestigious and rare Roman military honor granted to a soldier who had saved an entire army. As a reward for his defeat of the Samnites, Cossus was granted a triumph by the senate, one of two triumphs celebrated that year, as his colleague Marcus Valerius also celebrated a triumph for his own victories against the Samnites.

Second consulship and dictatorship
In 332 BC, Cossus was elected consul for a second time, with Gnaeus Domitius Calvinus as his colleague. His election was secured under the auspices of Marcus Valerius Corvus, his former consular partner, serving as interrex. In this year Marcus Papirius Crassus was appointed dictator as a reaction to rumors of a gallic invasion. However, these rumors turned out to be unfounded and the dictator resigned. The rest of the year was mostly quiet, the most significant event being that of a treaty negotiated between Rome and Alexander of Epirus, who had recently campaigned against the Samnites, as both he and the Romans shared the Samnites as a common enemy.

In 322 BC, in the midst of the Second Samnite War Cossus was appointed as dictator in order to fight off the Samnites, whom as rumor had it, hired a large number of mercenaries to strengthen their armies. As dictator Cossus appointed Marcus Fabius Ambustus as his Magister Equitem, and went to war. Soon after advancing on Samnite territory, Cossus was confronted with the Samnite army he was sent to face, however battle did not commence immediately as it was nearing nightfall, and both sides set camp for the night. Cossus however was fearful to confront the Samnite force in the morning and attempted a retreat in the night, however this retreat was noticed by the Samnite cavalry, whom in the morning made several attempts to charge the Roman force. Soon the Samnite infantry caught up with the cavalry and set battle lines, Cossus attempted to build a defensive camp, but was unable to make much progress without his soldiers being harassed by the enemy. Thus Cossus ordered his troops to prepare for battle, and since the Samnites were also prepared for battle, the battle commenced. The fighting was initially close as the Romans were determined and the Samnites were overconfident, and thus for five hours the battle raged on without either side gaining an advantage. This stalemate broke when the Samnites noticed that the Roman baggage train and supplies were left undefended and went to loot it, putting the Samnites into a disorganized position which Cossus exploited when he sent Marcus Fabius, his Magister Equitem, to charge the enemies who were looting the Roman supplies. The charge was a great success which greatly boosted the Roman morale and depleted the morale of the Samnites. After this the Roman infantry, reinvigorated by the success of the charge, pressed their attack and the cavalry charged into the Samnite ranks as well, causing them to rout in short order. Upon hearing of his victory, the Senate awarded Cossus with a second triumph.

However, there is a second tradition which is imparted by Livy which maintains that this battle was in fact conducted by the consuls of the year, and the purpose of Cossus' appointment as dictator was to oversee the Ludi Romani in place of the praetor who would usually oversee the games, as a result of the given praetor of the year being very ill at the time.

The next year the two consuls Spurius Postumius Albinus Caudinus and Titus Veturius Calvinus were caught in an ambush by the Samnites and were forced by them to pass under the yoke as well as to agree to a humiliating peace treaty. The following year, 320 BC, after the two consuls returned to Rome, the former consul Postumius requested the senate to allow him and his colleague to submit themselves to the Samnites as a punishment for their defeat, escorted by a Fetial, a type of priest whom ritually presided over foreign treaties and affairs. The senate approved this action and appointed Cossus as the fetial to follow the two ex consuls to Samnium. Once arrived, Cossus offered the former consuls to Gaius Pontius, the Samnite commander who was responsible for the Roman defeat the previous year. Upon hearing what Cossus had to say, Pontius briskly refused his request, believing that this was an attempt to invalidate the treaty of the previous year. This incident is the final time that Cossus appears in our sources.

References

Bibliography
 Broughton, T. Robert S., The Magistrates of the Roman Republic, American Philological Association (1952)
 Livy (Titus Livius), Ab Urbe Condita Libri

Ancient Roman politicians
Ancient Roman generals
Ancient Roman dictators
4th-century BC Roman consuls
Samnite Wars